The Rip Curl Pro 2015 was an event of the Association of Surfing Professionals for 2015 ASP World Tour.

This event was held from 1 to 12 April at Bells Beach, (Victoria, Australia) and contested by 36 surfers.

The tournament was won by Mick Fanning (AUS), who beat Adriano De Souza (BRA) in final.

Round 1

Round 2

Round 3

Round 4

Round 5

Quarter finals

Semi finals

Final

References

2015 World Surf League
2015 in Australian sport
Sports competitions in Victoria (Australia)